Seninskiye Dvoriki is a rural locality (a village) in Novoselskoye Rural Settlement, Kovrovsky District, Vladimir Oblast, Russia. The population was 28 as of 2010.

Geography 
Seninskiye Dvoriki is located 30 km south of Kovrov (the district's administrative centre) by road. Nerekhta is the nearest rural locality.

References 

Rural localities in Kovrovsky District